The Military ranks of Tanzania are the military insignia used by the Tanzania People's Defence Force. Being a former British colony, Tanzania shares a rank structure similar to that of the United Kingdom.

Current

Commissioned officer ranks
The rank insignia of commissioned officers.

Other ranks
The rank insignia of non-commissioned officers and enlisted personnel.

Former

Commissioned officer ranks
The rank insignia of commissioned officers.

References

External links
 

Tanzania
Military of Tanzania
Tanzania and the Commonwealth of Nations